Steve Sweeney (born September 5, 1949) is an American comedian.

Biography
Sweeney was born in Charlestown, a section of Boston. His Boston accent and idiosyncratic mannerisms are featured in his stand-up act. He has headlined in several comedy clubs including Caroline's Comedy Club in New York City.

A graduate of Charlestown High School, he earned a BA in Theatre Arts at the University of Massachusetts Boston (1974) and an MFA from the University of Southern California.

During the early 1970s, a group of Boston comedians regularly performed at a comedy club started by Martin Olson and Barry Crimmins in a back room of Ding-Ho, a Chinese Restaurant near Inman Square in Cambridge, MA. The group included Don Gavin, Lenny Clarke, Kevin Meaney, Jay Leno, Bobcat Goldthwait, Bill Sohonage, and Steven Wright. Sweeney became known for his use of dialects and commentary on the New England political scene in his act.

Sweeney had a role on Park Street Under, a Boston-based sitcom which has been cited as a potential inspiration for successful television show Cheers. He has appeared on shows such as the Late Show with David Letterman, Evening at The Improv, and Comics Come Home. Sweeney has also appeared in over 20 films, including Rodney Dangerfield's 
Back to School, Judd Apatow's Celtic Pride, and There's Something About Mary with Ben Stiller.

For a short time Steve was on the morning show on 100.7 FM WZLX, first with "Mornings with Tai and Steve Sweeney", followed by "Steve Sweeney's Neighborhood" after Tai left the station.

On November 3, 2005, Steve opened Steve Sweeney's Comedy Club in Boston's Copley Square with longtime friend Dick Doherty.

Currently, along with doing stand-up, he is also a guest judge on the local talent show "Community Auditions".

On March 29, 2013, Steve Sweeney appeared on Scorch PFG TV.

Steve performed a 5-minute act opening for J. Geils Band at the Boston One Fund concert.

Steve Sweeney and Joe Malone, the former Treasurer of the Commonwealth of Massachusetts, co-host a podcast called "Sweeney and Malone" on Boston Herald Radio.

Filmography

References

External links

Biography — Steve Sweeney - Comedian & Actor

1948 births
American stand-up comedians
University of Southern California alumni
Living people
Radio personalities from Boston
American radio personalities
Comedians from Massachusetts
University of Massachusetts Boston alumni